San Giuliano Martire is a 20th-century parochial church and titular church in northern Rome, dedicated to Saint Julian of Antioch (d. AD 305–311).

History 

San Giuliano Martire was built in 1993–95. It is made with concrete and red brick, floored in white marble and built on a basilica plan. Pope John Paul II visited in 1997.

On 18 February 2012, it was made a titular church to be held by a cardinal-deacon.

Cardinal-Protectors
Karl Josef Becker (2012–2015)
Kevin Farrell (2016–present)

References

External links

Titular churches
Roman Catholic churches completed in 1995
20th-century Roman Catholic church buildings in Italy